Bringing Home the Bait is the debut studio album by New York City noise rock band Live Skull, released in 1985 by Homestead Records.

Track listing

Personnel 
Adapted from the Bringing Home the Bait liner notes.

Live Skull
 Mark C. – guitar, vocals, photography
 Marnie Greenholz – bass guitar, vocals
 James Lo – drums
 Tom Paine – guitar, vocals

Production and additional personnel
 Martin Bisi – mixing
 Live Skull – production, mixing
 Hahn Rowe – engineering
Porky – cutting engineer

Release history

References

External links 
 
 Bringing Home the Bait at Bandcamp

1985 debut albums
Homestead Records albums
Live Skull albums